Longsdon is a civil parish in the district of Staffordshire Moorlands, Staffordshire, England. It contains 19 listed buildings that are recorded in the National Heritage List for England.  Of these, two are at Grade II*, the middle of the three grades, and the others are at Grade II, the lowest grade.  The parish contains the village of Longsdon and the surrounding area.  The Leek Branch of the Caldon Canal passes through the parish, and the listed buildings associated with this are four bridges and a tunnel entrance.  The other listed buildings consist of houses and associated structures, farmhouses and farm buildings, a milepost, and a church.


Key

Buildings

References

Citations

Sources

Lists of listed buildings in Staffordshire